Arne Kroták (born June 6, 1972) is a Czech-born Slovak former professional ice hockey left winger. Kroták previously played in the Slovak Extraliga for HK Poprad and HC Košice. In the Czech Extraliga for HC Zlín and HC Třinec.

Career statistics

Regular season and playoffs
Bold indicates led league

International

Awards and achievements
HK Poprad retired Kroták's no. 13 jersey on 13 September 2019.

Records
HK Poprad team record for career games played (980)
HK Poprad team record for career goals (380)
HK Poprad team record for career assists (486)
HK Poprad team record for career points (866)
HK Poprad team record for career playoff games played (102)
HK Poprad team record for career playoff goals (39)
HK Poprad team record for career playoff assists (30)
HK Poprad team record for career playoff points (69)

References

External links

 

1972 births
Living people
Les Aigles de Nice players
MHK Kežmarok players
HC Košice players
HC Oceláři Třinec players
HK Poprad players
Slovak ice hockey left wingers
HK Spišská Nová Ves players
PSG Berani Zlín players
Sportspeople from Třinec
Czechoslovak ice hockey left wingers
Expatriate ice hockey players in France
Slovak expatriate sportspeople in France